Mogwadi, also known as Dendron, is a small town on the R521 road in the Capricorn District Municipality in the Limpopo province of South Africa.

Located about 61 km northwest of Polokwane. It was laid out on the farm Duitsland and then managed by a health committee. The former name is derived from the Greek word for ‘tree’ and refers to the abundance of indigenous trees in the area.

References

Populated places in the Molemole Local Municipality